Rapture (Italian:Sangue sul sagrato) is a 1950 Italian melodrama film directed by Goffredo Alessandrini.

Cast
Glenn Langan as Pietro Leoni
Elsie Albiin as Francesca Hutton
Lorraine Miller as Marisa Hutton
Eduardo Ciannelli as Arnaldo
Douglass Dumbrille as W.C. Hutton
Goffredo Alessandrini as Renato
Harriet Medin as Nurse (as Harriet White)
Luisa Rossi
Carlo Ninchi
Carlo Giustini
Piero Lulli
Virgilio Riento
Emilio Cigoli
Pina Gallini

References

External links
 

1950 films
1950s Italian-language films
1950 romantic drama films
Films directed by Goffredo Alessandrini
Melodrama films
Italian romantic drama films
Italian black-and-white films
1950s Italian films